Wola Lubecka  is a village in the administrative district of Gmina Ryglice, within Tarnów County, Lesser Poland Voivodeship, in southern Poland.

The village has a population of around 862.

References

Wola Lubecka